Sharon Stone is an American actress, film producer, and former fashion model. The following is a filmography of her work.

Stone came to international attention for her role in Paul Verhoeven's erotic thriller Basic Instinct. She was nominated for an Academy Award for Best Actress and won a Golden Globe Award for Best Actress in a Motion Picture Drama for her performance in Casino. She also received a Golden Globe nomination for Basic Instinct.

She has also appeared on television programs and in television films and produced several films.

Film

Television

See also
 List of awards and nominations received by Sharon Stone

References
 General

 

 Specific

External links
 
 

Stone, Sharon
Stone, Sharon
Filmography